Patrik Isaksson is a 2006 Patrik Isaksson studio album.

Track listing
Innan klockan slår
Vår sista dag
Faller du så faller jag
Vi mot dom
Till min syster
Långt härifrån
Dansa om du törs
Vem är han
Älska mig som mest då
Det var längesen
Vinternatt

Contributors
Patrik Isaksson - singer, composer, song lyrics
Jimmy Källkvist - bass
Joacim Backman - guitar
Björn Öqvist - piano
Christer Jansson - drums

Charts

Weekly charts

Year-end charts

References

External links

2006 albums
Patrik Isaksson (singer) albums
Swedish-language albums